Ernest Boateng (born 6 June 2001) is a Ghanaian professional footballer who plays as a forward  for I-League club Real Kashmir.

Club career

DAC Dunajská Streda
Boateng made his Fortuna Liga debut for Dunajská Streda against Slovan Bratislava on 7 December 2019. He completed the full match of the 2−0 defeat.

References

External links
 FC DAC 1904 Dunajská Streda official club profile 
 Futbalnet profile 
  
 

2001 births
Living people
Footballers from Accra
Ghanaian footballers
Ghanaian expatriate footballers
Association football forwards
FC DAC 1904 Dunajská Streda players
FC ŠTK 1914 Šamorín players
Slovak Super Liga players
2. Liga (Slovakia) players
Expatriate footballers in Slovakia
Ghanaian expatriate sportspeople in Slovakia